Bharat Pumps & Compressors Limited (BPC) is a central public sector undertaking under the ownership of Ministry of Heavy Industries, Government of India. The psu manufactures Reciprocating pumps, Centrifugal pumps, Reciprocating compressors, and high pressure seamless Gas cylinders.  Headquarters in Allahabad.

History
BPC was set up in 1970 to cut the country’s dependence on import of hi-tech equipment like pumps and compressors for use in critical areas like oil & gas exploration, refineries, chemical & fertilizer plant and nuclear plants. Unfortunately, the company was unable to make profits. Eventually, it turned sick and was referred to the Board for Industrial and Financial Restructuring (BIFR). The company was referred to the BIFR and was on the verge of being closed down after 35 years of operations.

The company has seen a dramatic turnaround in its performance from the financial year 2005-06.
The turnaround of the company is credited to Abhay Kumar Jain, who was appointed the MD of the sick company in the year 2005-06. The special efforts and corporate strategies put in place by Jain, after joining on 31.12.2005, yielded the much awaited turnaround of the Company. BPCL achieved a net profit of ₹1.84 crores during Financial Year 2005-06 after accounting for interest amounting to ₹135 million as against a loss of ₹108.6 million during previous year 2004-05. This remarkable feat of turnaround is of significance since it was achieved without considering the benefits of financial restructuring.
Presently, the company is again running in loss. Jain invested nearly ₹100 crores in purchase of new machines and had projected business of ₹1600 crores but this target was never achieved and as a result, company incurred loss.

On the 28th of September 2016, the Government of India announced the privatization of Bharat Pumps & Compressors. On 17 April 2018 the Government of India issued an Expression of Interest for a 100% stake in Bharat Pumps & Compressors.

On the 14th of Jan 2021, the Government of India announced the liquidation of Bharat Pumps & Compressors.

References

External links 
 Business Line: Navaratna' cos to help revive bleeding PSUs
 The Hindu: Bharat Pumps' revamp plan in place
 Moneycontrol.com: Buy BHEL; target of Rs 1650: Merrill Lynch
 Ex - Chairman and Managing Director BPC, Naini, Shri. Abhay Kumar Jain

Government-owned companies of India
Engineering companies of India
Companies based in Allahabad
1970 establishments in Uttar Pradesh
Indian companies established in 1970